Det store varpet is a 1961 Norwegian drama film directed by Nils R. Müller, starring Finn Bernhoft, Per Christensen and Jack Fjeldstad. The film is about two brothers who are working as fishermen with their father. It was entered into the 2nd Moscow International Film Festival.

Cast
 Finn Bernhoft
 Per Christensen as Ola
 Jack Fjeldstad
 Egil Lorck
 Alfred Maurstad as Rederen Elias
 Ragnhild Michelsen
 Bjarne Skarbøvik
 Tor Stokke
 Rolf Søder
 Bjørg Vatle as Birgit
 Kåre Wicklund
 Ottar Wicklund

References

External links
 
 

1961 films
1961 drama films
1960s Norwegian-language films
Films directed by Nils R. Müller
Norwegian drama films